Sher Ali (born 9 April 1970) is a Pakistani former cricketer. He played 103 first-class and 69 List A matches for several domestic teams in Pakistan between 1986 and 1999.

See also
 List of Pakistan Automobiles Corporation cricketers

References

External links
 

1970 births
Living people
Pakistani cricketers
Bahawalpur cricketers
Lahore cricketers
Pakistan Automobiles Corporation cricketers
Pakistan National Shipping Corporation cricketers
Peshawar cricketers
Rawalpindi cricketers
United Bank Limited cricketers
Cricketers from Lahore